Bolaño is a Hispanic surname (Spanish for "stone cannonball" or "stoneshot"). It may also refer to:

 Jorge Bolaño (born 1977), Colombian footballer
 Roberto Bolaño (1953–2003), Chilean writer

Or to:

 Amado Antonio Heredia Bolaño, mayor of Antonio Díaz Municipality
  (1896-1971), Mexican philologist
 Chico Bolaño, musician friend of Leandro Díaz
 Don Nicolás de Castro Bolaño, Colonel at the Battle of Glen Shiel
 Luis Bolaño, boxer defeated by Juan Manuel López
 Pedro de Bolaño, a Lord of Galicia (Spain)

See also
 Bolano, a municipality in Italy
 Bolaños (disambiguation)
 Bollano (disambiguation)

Surnames of Spanish origin
Spanish-language surnames